Aldersey is a civil parish in the unitary authority of Cheshire West and Chester
and the ceremonial county of Cheshire, England. According to the 2001 census the parish had a population of 72, increasing to 132 at the 2011 census.

See also

Listed buildings in Aldersey

References

Civil parishes in Cheshire